The Nebraska Coliseum (sometimes referred to as the NU Coliseum or The Coliseum) is an indoor coliseum on the campus of the University of Nebraska–Lincoln in Lincoln, Nebraska. It was the home of Nebraska's men's basketball team from 1926 to 1976 and volleyball team from 1975 to 2013. Since volleyball moved to the Bob Devaney Sports Center in 2013, the Coliseum has been primarily used for student recreation, and occasionally hosts wrestling meets.

History
The possibility of constructing a new multi-use venue on campus at the University of Nebraska was proposed in 1924 by John Selleck of the school's Athletic Board. The building that would become the Coliseum, located just east of Memorial Stadium, was designed by Ellery Davis and Walter Wilson, who also designed Memorial Stadium, Morrill Hall, and Love Memorial Library. The first event at the arena was a 25–14 men's basketball loss to Kansas on February 6, 1926. NU's women's team did not play at the Coliseum until 1974, and both moved to the NU Sports Complex (later renamed the Bob Devaney Sports Center) when it was completed in 1976. The NSAA Boys and Girls State Basketball Championship was held in the Coliseum until it also moved to the Devaney Center, and later to Pinnacle Bank Arena.

Volleyball

After the completion of the NU Sports Complex in 1976, the Coliseum primarily served as the home venue of Nebraska's volleyball team, undergoing numerous renovations to tailor the facility specifically to the needs of the program.

NU compiled an all-time record of 511–36 at the 4,030-seat Nebraska Coliseum, losing just three home matches in thirty-three seasons of conference play. In 1991, the Cornhuskers played home games at the Devaney Center while the Coliseum was being renovated. NU has hosted at least one NCAA Tournament match every year since 1984, including a 52–4 postseason record at the Coliseum. Nebraska established an NCAA record with their eighty-eighth consecutive home win in 2009, a streak that ended at ninety when UCLA defeated NU in front of an NCAA regular season-record crowd of 13,870. In 2008, the AVCA's Kathy DeBoer described the Coliseum as "the epicenter of volleyball fandom".

The Coliseum was one of few collegiate arenas designed specifically for volleyball. It was noted for its classical architecture and intimate atmosphere. At the Coliseum, the Cornhuskers began a streak of 285 consecutive sellouts that continues at the Devaney Center, an NCAA record for any women's sport. The arena was the subject of a CBS Sports documentary in 2011.

Vacancy
The Coliseum is no longer the primary home venue for any of NU's athletic programs, though it is used as an extra practice facility and as office space by Nebraska's gymnastics teams. It is attached to Cook Pavilion and is used as part of the university's City Campus recreation center.

Other events
The Coliseum hosted various non-sporting events early in its history, including an Elvis Presley concert in 1956, an address by then-Vice President Richard Nixon in 1960, and a speech by United States Senator Robert F. Kennedy during his 1968 presidential campaign, just two months before his assassination.

References

Nebraska Cornhuskers basketball venues
College volleyball venues in the United States
Sports in Lincoln, Nebraska
Sports venues in Nebraska
Defunct college basketball venues in the United States
Buildings and structures in Lincoln, Nebraska
University of Nebraska–Lincoln
Tourist attractions in Lincoln, Nebraska